Richard Muzhange (born 30 January 1991) is a Zimbabwean cricketer.

References

1991 births
Living people
Zimbabwean cricketers
Place of birth missing (living people)
Mid West Rhinos cricketers